The Giraffes can be one of the following bands:

The Giraffes (Brooklyn band)
 The Giraffes (album)
The Giraffes (Seattle band)

See also
Giraffe (disambiguation)